"Diana" is a song by English-Irish boy band One Direction from their third studio album Midnight Memories (2013). It was released on 18 November 2013, a week prior to the album's release.

The song debuted at number two on the Irish Singles Chart on 19 November 2013, the day after it was released; it was one of three One Direction songs in the top 10 that week, along with the album's title track "Midnight Memories" (number three) and "Story of My Life" (number six). One Direction performed the song on all two of their major concert tours: Where We Are Tour (2014) and On the Road Again Tour (2015).

Background
The song was written by Julian Bunetta, Jamie Scott, John Ryan and band members Louis Tomlinson and Liam Payne. In an interview with MTV News, when Bunetta was asked if the song was named after someone called Diana, he replied "Can't tell! It's definitely about somebody, maybe one day somebody will tell. But we can't tell. I think that the lyric probably pertains to what a lot of the fans are going through and feel... People feel like they're alone and that's what their escape is, Twitter and [finding] people that also relate to them, and everyone finding each other from different parts of the world that are going through the same things." He went on to say, "[I think] it was a kind of a pretty accurate depiction of the loneliness someone can feel in such a huge world and someone saying 'Hey, I feel you. I know you're there. I notice you; it's OK. You're not alone'."

Tomlinson told Perez Hilton's Danielle Sacco for Perez TV that, "We [were] actually working with a few different names for the chorus, and the top name originally was 'Joanna', which is actually quite close to my mum's name, and it felt a little weird so we changed it to Diana."

Chart performance
The day after its release, the song debuted at number two on the Irish Singles Chart, where it was one of three One Direction songs from Midnight Memories in the top 10, along with the album's title track "Midnight Memories" (number three) and "Story of My Life" (number six). Diana debuted on the Billboard Hot 100 at number 11 on 7 December and dropped off the chart the following week.

Charts

References

2013 songs
One Direction songs
Number-one singles in Denmark
Number-one singles in Greece
Syco Music singles
Songs written by Jamie Scott
Songs written by Julian Bunetta
Songs written by John Ryan (musician)
Songs written by Louis Tomlinson
Songs written by Liam Payne